Lebanese nationalism, a nationalistic ideology, considers the Lebanese people as a distinct nation independent from the Arab world. The ideology considers the Lebanese people to be direct descendants of the Phoenicians.

This ideology is rooted in the 19th-century sectarian war between the Maronites and Druze that occurred in Mount Lebanon. It took its formalized form during the inter-war period and the French Mandate of Syria, when it served primarily as a tool in opposing Arab nationalism and in justifying the existence of the nascent country of Lebanon.

During the 20th century, especially during the Lebanese Civil War, Lebanese nationalism was associated with the Kataeb Party, Lebanese Forces, National Liberal Party and secularist movements like Guardians of the Cedars, National Bloc and the Lebanese Renewal Party, spearheaded by the renowned late Lebanese poet and philosopher Said Akl.

Lebanese nationalism goes even further and incorporates irredentist views going beyond the Lebanese borders and seeks to unify all the lands of ancient Phoenicia around present-day Lebanon. That comes from the fact that present-day Lebanon, the Mediterranean coast of Syria, and northern Israel is the area that roughly correspond to ancient Phoenicia and so most Lebanese people identify with the ancient Phoenician population of that region. Therefore, the proposed Greater Lebanese country includes Lebanon, Mediterranean coast of Syria, and northern Israel.

The cultural and linguistic heritage of the Lebanese people is a blend of both indigenous elements and the foreign cultures that have come to rule the land and its people over the course of thousands of years. In a 2013 interview, the lead investigator, Pierre Zalloua, pointed out that genetic variation preceded religious variation and divisions: "Lebanon already had well-differentiated communities with their own genetic peculiarities, but not significant differences, and religions came as layers of paint on top. There is no distinct pattern that shows that one community carries significantly more Phoenician than another."

Future Movement and the Free Patriotic Movement also follow Lebanese nationalism ideology.

See also
Phoenicianism

Notable Lebanese nationalists
Youssef Bey Karam (1823–1889), Christian governor 
Elias Peter Hoayek (1843–1931), Maronite patriarch of Antioch
Pierre Gemayel (1905–1984), politician
Camille Chamoun (1900–1987), president of Lebanon
Bachir Gemayel (1947–1982), president of Lebanon
Dany Chamoun (1934–1990), politician
Etienne Sakr (born 1937), nationalist leader
Said Akl, (1911–2014), poet, philosopher, writer, playwright, and language reformer
Kahlil Gibran (1883-1931) writer, poet, and visual artist
Samir Geagea (1952- ), president of the Lebanese Forces

References

Salem, Paul Notes on the Question of Lebanese Nationalism